Black Stockings FC (Turkish: Siyah Çoraplılar FK) were a Turkish football club based in the district of Kadıköy, Istanbul, Ottoman Empire. The club were the first football club in Turkish football history. They dissolved in 1901.

History
Black Stockings FC were founded by Fuat Hüsnü Kayacan, Mehmet Ali, Reşat Danyal, Rıza Tevfik, Daniş, Tahsin Nahit in Istanbul in 1901. The club were dissolved after their first match on 26 October 1901, because the players were indicted after the sultan's detective Ali Şamil Bey and police raided the field.
The first Turkish football player Fuat Hüsnü Kayacan played for Black Stockings.

See also
 List of Turkish sports clubs by foundation dates

References
 Dünden Bugüne İstanbul Ansiklopedisi, vol. 2, p. 260 (1994)
 Spor Ansiklopedisi (1991)
 İlk Türk Futbol Takımı. Türk Futbol Tarihi vol.1. page(12). (June 1992) Türkiye Futbol Federasyonu Yayınları.

Defunct football clubs in Turkey
Association football clubs established in 1901
Association football clubs disestablished in 1899
Sport in Istanbul